Trinity Benson (born January 16, 1997) is an American football wide receiver for the Detroit Lions of the National Football League (NFL). He played college football at East Central University.

College career
Benson played college football for the East Central Tigers. He rushed for 324 yards and five touchdowns with 507 yards and four touchdowns on 45 receptions as a senior and was named first-team All-Great American Conference.

Professional career

Denver Broncos
Benson signed with the Denver Broncos as an undrafted free agent on April 29, 2019. He was cut by the team at the end of training camp on August 31, 2019. The Broncos resigned Benson to their practice squad on September 24, 2019.

Detroit Lions
On August 31, 2021, the Broncos traded Benson and a sixth-round selection in the 2023 NFL Draft to the Detroit Lions in exchange for fifth- and seventh-round selections in the 2022 NFL Draft. Local Detroiter's refer to him as "the steak bet" due to his popularity on the Detroit lions fan forum podcast.

On August 30, 2022, Benson was waived by the Lions.

Denver Broncos (second stint)
On October 11, 2022, Benson was signed to the Denver Broncos practice squad.

Detroit Lions (second stint)
On November 9, 2022, Benson was signed by the Detroit Lions off the Broncos practice squad. He was placed on injured reserve on November 18.

NFL career statistics

Regular season

References

External links
East Central Tigers bio
Detroit Lions bio

1997 births
Living people
Players of American football from Texas
American football wide receivers
East Central Tigers football players
Denver Broncos players
Detroit Lions players